Samuel J. "Skyrocket" Smith (March 19, 1868 – April 26, 1916) was a Major League Baseball first baseman. He played for the Louisville Colonels of the American Association during the first half of the 1888 season (April 18-July 8).
 
As the regular first baseman for 58 games, Smith hit .239 (49-for-206), but 24 bases on balls and 11 hit by pitches (#9 in the league) pushed his on-base percentage up to .349. He hit 1 home run, had 31 runs batted in, scored 27 runs, and had five stolen bases. He was average defensively for his era, with a fielding percentage of .970. The Colonels had a record of 21–40 (.344) at the time of Smith's departure, and were 27–47 (.365) afterwards. Smith also played in various minor leagues from 1884 to 1895.

After his baseball career was over, Smith became a firefighter for the city of St. Louis, Missouri. He died of uremia at the age of 48.

References

External links

Retrosheet

1868 births
1916 deaths
19th-century baseball players
Major League Baseball first basemen
Louisville Colonels players
New Castle Neshannocks players
St. Joseph Reds players
Denver (minor league baseball) players
Des Moines Prohibitionists players
Seattle (minor league baseball) players
Walla Walla Walla Wallas players
Memphis Lambs players
Memphis Giants players
Baseball players from Baltimore
Deaths from kidney disease
American firefighters
Burials at Calvary Cemetery (St. Louis)